Hymenoxys subintegra is a North American species of flowering plant in the daisy family known by the common name Arizona rubberweed. It has been found only in the states of Arizona and Utah in the southwestern United States. Many of the populations lie inside Grand Canyon National Park, others in Kaibab National Forest.

Hymenoxys subintegra grows in open areas, generally at the edges of forests at elevations of 2100–2800 meters (7000–9300 feet). It is a perennial herb up to 60 cm (2 feet) tall. One plant can produce 10–85 flower heads in a branching, flat-topped array. Each head has 10–16 yellow ray flowers and 50–100 tiny yellow disc flowers.

References

subintegra
Flora of Arizona
Flora of Utah
Grand Canyon National Park
Plants described in 1883
Flora without expected TNC conservation status